Something Real may refer to:

Something Real (Meg & Dia album)
Something Real (Phoebe Snow album)
Something Real (Stephanie Mills album)
Something Real, a 2016 album by Fedde Le Grand

"Something Real" (Summer Walker song)
"Something Real (Inside Me/Inside You)", a 1987 song by Mr. Mister
"Something Real", a song by Shana
"Something Real", a song by Armin van Buuren from the album Balance

"Something Real", a short story by Rick Wilber